Fr. Robert A. Mitchell (19 January 1926 – 5 October 2006) was an American Jesuit. He was born in New York, growing up in the Bronx, and entered the Society of Jesus on July 30, 1943. He subsequently trained in Belgium, where he was ordained in 1956.

His career included appointments as:
 1959–63: Dean of Le Moyne College
 1966–72: Provincial of New York
 1972–76: First president of the Jesuit Conference of the United States
 1979–90: President of the University of Detroit, then Chancellor of the merged University of Detroit Mercy (1990–92).
 1993–2000: 10th president of Le Moyne College.

References

20th-century American Jesuits
21st-century American Jesuits
Presidents of Le Moyne College
Presidents of the University of Detroit Mercy
1926 births
2006 deaths
American expatriates in Belgium
20th-century American academics